Etharkkum Thunindhavan, also known under the initialism ET,  is a 2022 Indian Tamil-language action thriller film written and directed by Pandiraj and produced by Sun Pictures. The film stars Suriya, Priyanka Arul Mohan, and Vinay Rai. The music is composed by D. Imman, with cinematography and editing being handled by R. Rathnavelu and Ruben respectively. The film revolves around a lawyer who turns into an executioner against woman trafficking.

The project was officially announced during October 2020, under the tentative title Suriya 40. It also marked the production's first venture with Suriya, as the company had previously distributed the actor's films Ayan (2009) and Singam (2010). Filming began on 15 February 2021 and was completed within mid-November, despite losing out three months of filming due to the COVID-19 lockdown restrictions. It was primarily shot at various locations in Chennai, Madurai, Karaikudi and Courtallam, with a song sequence being shot in Goa.

The film released in theatres worldwide on 10 March 2022, along with dubbed versions in Telugu, Hindi, Malayalam and Kannada. It received mixed to positive reviews from critics.

Plot 
Kannabiran is a lawyer at the Madras High Court who lives with his family consisting of his father Aadhirayar and mother Kosalai, in Thennaadu. Their neighboring village is Vadanaadu. Residents of both villages believe that god and goddess Shiva and Shakti originated in these villages and hold a grand festival celebrating their togetherness. Women in Thennaadu are married to men in Vadanaadu and vice-versa. However, a woman from Thennaadu, who is married to a man from Vadanaadu, commits suicide, both the villages engage in rivalry. 

Kannabiran falls in love with Aadhini from Vadanaadu, and the two of them get married. Aadhini's friend Yazhnila is in love with Nithin. Nithin, who is Inba's henchman, cheats her by asking her to sleep with a man. Yazhnila tries to escape from Nithin's clutches but is chased and beaten badly by Inba's men. Kannabiran comes to her rescue in the nick of time and warns both Inba and his men. Previously, Inba was responsible for killing his pregnant wife and a girl named Monika, who was killed and made it look like a car accident. After Kannabiran and Aadhini's marriage, Kannabiran gives shelter to Yazhnila and motivates her by standing beside her in the fight against the pornography racket run by Inba. 

However, when Kannabiran and Aadhini get intimate, their video is secretly shot by Inba, who also shoots a video of Aadhini bathing. When they receive the videos, they are both shocked and devastated. Despite all of the happenings, Kannabiran remains headstrong and requests Aadhini to stay strong and fight with him. Soon, he gathers all the victims of Inba's racket and files a petition against Inba and his men, but Inba's advocate produces false evidence, showing that he is a philanthropist and educationalist. As a result, the judge dismisses the case and orders the arrests of Kannabiran and Aadhirayar. After spending two months in prison, Aadhirayar motivates his son to turn into an executioner and to see beyond his initial beliefs in the law and order to deliver justice. 

Kannabiran readily accepts and kidnaps all the men working for Inba and locks them up in a factory. After a deadly and intense cat-and-mouse chase between Kannabiran and Inba, Kannabiran is able to get access to the systems that Inba and his men use for creating pornographic content and destroys them. Kannabiran ruthlessly beats Inba's men and lectures their parents on men respecting women and their privacy. Kannabiran is able to prove that Inba and his men have intimate recordings of 500 women belonging to their village and are committed to spoiling the lives of those women by not letting them get married and driving off their dignity in society. Kannabiran also recollects his past when he was nine years old, his younger sister was taken by some people and brutally assaulted to death. 

The relatives of Inba's henchmen are now ashamed of them and kill them for their actions. As for Inba, he is killed by his father-in-law after Inba killed the latter's daughter and spread rumors after her death. Kannabiran surrenders himself before the police and admits that he committed all the murders. Kosalai berates him for turning into a ruthless murderer even after witnessing his family's struggles and public humiliation. Kannabiran reminds her that he did not commit the murders, but simply removed the weeds that are harmful to society. He is arrested for the judicial killings, but the women of the village, knowing that he did the right thing demands his release.

Cast 

 Suriya as Adv. A. R. Kannabiran, a Madras High Court lawyer
 Priyanka Arul Mohan as Aadhini Kannabiran, Kannabiran's wife
 Vinay Rai as Inbasekharan (Inba), a man who runs a pornography racket
 Sathyaraj as Aadhirayar, Kannabiran's father
 Saranya Ponvannan as Kosalai, Kannabiran's mother
Ilavarasu as Aadhini's father
Devadarshini as Anjumani, Aadhini's mother
M. S. Bhaskar as Karuppaiya
 Soori as Aavani Soolamani, Aadhini's uncle
Madhusudhan Rao as Inba's father, the Central Minister
Hareesh Peradi as Inba's father-in-law
Jayaprakash as SP Thiraviya Pandian
Vela Ramamoorthy as Kaverinandan, Kannabiran's uncle and Aadhirayar's younger brother
Pugazh as Soolamani's sidekick
Sai Dheena as Police Inspector Moses Michael Faraday, Inba's henchman
Subbu Panchu as Prof. Alagunambi, Inba's henchman
Saran Shakthi as Nithin, Inba's henchman
Ciby Bhuvana Chandran as Aaron, Inba's henchman
Dhivya Duraisamy as Yazhnila, Aadhini's classmate who was cheated by Nithin
K. P. Jagan as Kannabiran's lawyer friend
Ramar as Kannabiran's junior
Tiger Thangadurai as Kannabiran's junior
Viji Chandrasekhar as Judge
R. N. R. Manohar as Aaron's father
Supergood Subramani as Yazhnila's father
Akash Premkumar as Inba's henchman
Vignesh Shanmugam as Inba's henchman
Poster Nandakumar as Minister

Production

Development 
During May 2019, Suriya was reported to work on a project backed by Sun Pictures, in his third collaboration with them after Ayan (2009) and Singam (2010). The film was speculated to be directed by Hari, who had previously worked with Suriya in Aaru (2005), Vel (2007) and the Singam franchise, but he eventually exited the project without revealing the actual reasons. They later collaborated on another film titled Aruvaa, which was produced by Studio Green. But this project was also shelved and Suriya chose to do a film with Pandiraj instead of a project with either Adanga Maru director Karthik Thangavel or an unnamed Telugu director. Pandiraj earlier worked with Suriya, whose production company 2D Entertainment had backed his projects Pasanga 2, which had the latter playing a supporting character and Karthi's Kadaikutty Singam.

Pre-production
On the occasion of Dusshera (25 October 2020), Sun Pictures confirmed the project under the title Suriya 40, which deciphers to Suriya's 40th film as a lead actor; it also marked Pandiraj's second film with the production house after their collaboration with Sivakarthikeyan starrer Namma Veettu Pillai. Unlike Pandiraj's earlier films, which were based on family emotions and sentiments, such as Kadaikutty Singam and Namma Veettu Pillai, this film is touted to be an action-drama film, with space for commercial elements. This is known to be Pandiraj's second action-based film, after Kathakali.
Pandiraj reportedly wrote the story, which is based on the 2019 Pollachi sexual assault case. The film's title Etharkkum Thunindhavan was officially announced on the eve of Suriya's birthday (22 July 2021), which refers to the 1976 film of the same name, that starred his father Sivakumar in the lead role.

Casting 

In November 2020, Rashmika Mandanna was reported to play the female lead, but Pandiraj refuted the rumours about the casting process. In January 2021, the production house announced that D. Imman would compose music for the film, following successive collaborations with Pandiraj in Kadaikkutty Singam and Namma Veettu Pillai. The film marks Imman's maiden collaboration with Suriya. The same month, Priyanka Arul Mohan was announced as the female lead, bagging her second Tamil film, following Sivakarthikeyan's Doctor (2021). Her character is revealed to be Aadhini, and she will essay Suriya's love interest in the film. Sathyaraj too joined the film in a supporting role.Rajkiran was also announced a part of the film, working with Suriya after two decades; they were last seen in Nandha (2001), but did not form a part of the cast in this film. Vadivelu was reported to work with Suriya after their last collaboration in Aadhavan (2009), but Soori was eventually announced as a part of the cast. He will reportedly essay the role of the heroine's uncle in the film. Despite rumours of Sarathkumar and Prasanna being offered to play the antagonist in the film, the role eventually went to Vinay Rai. Saran Shakthi essayed a character with negative shades in the film. It has been reported that the film has 40 significant characters being present in the film, including Jayaprakash, Saranya Ponvannan, and Devadarshini, amongst others. Director-actor K. P. Jagan announced being a part of the film and also joined the second schedule in early-September 2021.

Filming 

The film was launched on 15 February 2021, with the attendance of the principal cast and crew members, excluding Suriya as he was diagnosed with COVID-19. The makers filmed few scenes with the ensemble cast without Suriya. After recovering from COVID-19, Suriya joined the film's shooting on 18 March 2021. He shared the shooting still from the film at Binny Mills in Chennai on social media handles, confirming his presence. Following a brief schedule for 21 days, the team headed to Madurai for filming major sequences during April 2021. An action sequence with a huge crowd was planned to be filmed, but due to the restrictions imposed by the Tamil Nadu government due to the second wave of COVID-19, the plan was dropped considering the safety of the crew members working on the film. By late April 2021, 35% of the film's shooting had been completed before the 
COVID-19 lockdown was imposed.

Shooting of the film resumed on 12 July 2021, following the relaxations of COVID-19 lockdown. The team filmed few scenes in Chennai instead of Karaikudi. During the shooting schedule, Victor, who worked as an assistant to Pandiraj, was detained by the police in Koyambedu and seized the rifles and pistols used in the film, which were later found out to be dummies. He was detained as he did not have proper documents for licensing. In mid-July 2021, the team headed to Karaikkudi for shooting a 51-day long schedule with crucial sequences, and that was completed within September 2021. The team then headed to Courtallam for the final and brief schedule of the film in mid-September 2021.

At the end of the month, it was reported that two of the songs will be shot in Chennai and Goa, by October 2021, and upon completion of that, the team may wrap up filming. However, one song which was directed by Jani Master was delayed, as the track had to be shot in a grand manner, with a huge star cast and also included extensive dance steps. As a result, the cast needed more time to prepare. With the completion of patchwork scenes, the makers wrapped the shooting of the film on 10 November 2021, and Pandiraj shared the news through Twitter. Post wrap-up, Suriya had gifted gold coins worth  to the actors and technicians who worked in the film to make it a memorable experience for the team.

Post-production 

Post-production works began during mid-November 2021, after completion of the film's production. Suriya began dubbing for the film on 17 November. Vinay Rai completed dubbing for his role on 24 December 2021. Post-production works were completed within late-December 2021, and the final copy was ready by January 2022. The film was submitted to the Central Board of Film Certification (CBFC) where the film received U/A certificate. Several scenes featuring excessive violence were edited from the film, with the exception of a few action sequences. The film's final runtime was 151 minutes. In February 2022, Sun Pictures released a still featuring Suriya who gave his voice-over for the film's dubbed-Telugu version. It is the second time he dubbed in Telugu, after previously doing the same for Gang, the Telugu dubbed version of Thaanaa Serndha Koottam.

Music 

The music of the film is composed by D. Imman in his second collaboration with Pandiraj, following Kadaikutty Singam (2018) and Namma Veettu Pillai (2019). Imman was initially roped in for the untitled film with Suriya, which was directed by Siva, and also for Aruvaa, which was directed by Hari. As the projects did not materialise, this film marked his first collaboration with the actor. Yugabharathi and Vignesh Shivan were initially hired for writing lyrics. In November 2021, actor Sivakarthikeyan was also announced to pen lyrics for one of the songs in the film.

The composer had worked with an ensemble musical team of 100 musicians to work on the film's soundtrack and background music. In early-December, reports surfaced that G. V. Prakash Kumar would record the introductory track for the film, and Anirudh Ravichander was also roped in to croon for another track in the album, of a different genre. Later, the team officially announced that both the composers had recorded vocals for the same track "Vaada Thambi", which was written by Vignesh Shivan. Carnatic musician Brinda Manickavasakan made her debut as a playback singer in feature film, with the track "Ullam Urugudhaiya".

On 30 January, the makers unveiled the film's theme music and original background score through YouTube, a month before the film's release in March 2022. The tracks were later bundled into the film's soundtrack album and was released separately into music platforms, the following day (31 January 2022). The soundtracks for the dubbed versions were released on 4 March 2022.

Marketing 

On 22 July 2021, the makers unveiled the first look poster for the film, coinciding on the eve of Suriya's 46th birthday. The teaser of the film was released on 18 February 2022. Both the first look as well as the teaser received a positive feedback from the audience. The teaser also has garnered over four million views with over seven lakh YouTube likes from the users and Suriya's fans within a day of the teaser having been released on YouTube.

On Twitter, the makers released a new poster of the film on 1 February 2022 with the release date of the film mentioned. The poster features Suriya holding a sword as he looks directly into the lens. The trailer of the film was released on 2 March 2022. The trailer of the film which was released in Tamil, Telugu, Hindi, Malayalam and Kannada languages crossed over 5 million views from audiences.

Times of India reviewing the trailer of the film stated that "This film is one of the most awaited films, which has been in a production for over a year now ".

To launch the trailer of the film, a pre release event was held in three different states:- in Tamil Nadu (Tamil), Hyderabad (Telugu) and Kerala (Malayalam) . On 2 March a pre release event was held in Chennai with all the cast and crew participating in the event. To promote the film's Telugu version, another pre release event was held on 3 March, at Daspalla Convention city in Hyderabad. The event was organized by Shreyas Media. Telugu actors and directors Rana Daggubati, directors Gopichand Malineni and Boyapati Srinu graced the event as chief guests, apart from the film's cast and crew. The third pre release event was held in Kochi, Kerala, to promote the film's Malayalam version.

Release

Theatrical 
Etharkkum Thunindhavan released in theatres on 10 March 2022. The film was released in Tamil along with dubbed versions in Telugu, Malayalam, Hindi, and Kannada languages. This was also Suriya's first release in theatres in three years as his previous films Soorarai Pottru and  Jai Bhim were released through over-the-top platform Amazon Prime Video.

The film was initially scheduled for theatrical release on 24 December 2021, coinciding with the Christmas weekend. However, in mid-October, reports surfaced that the film will be released a week prior to the originally slated date (17 December), which would clash with Allu Arjun starrer Pushpa: The Rise and Tom Holland starrer Spider-Man: No Way Home. As Sun Pictures' other production, the Vijay-starrer Beast (2022), which was originally scheduled to release on Pongal (14 January 2022), was postponed to April 2022 citing production delays, the makers planned for a release on that festival, since the difficulties in post-production meant that the film would not be released within Christmas. However, on 19 November 2021, it was announced that the film would be theatrically released on 4 February 2022. Etharkkum Thunindhavan was postponed from that date due to increase in COVID-19 cases.

Distribution 
The distribution rights of the film in Tamil Nadu were acquired by Udhayanidhi Stalin under the banner of Red Giant Movies. Asian Multiplexes Pvt Ltd acquired the distribution rights of the film in Andhra Pradesh and Telangana states. UFO Moviez India Limited acquired the distribution rights in North India.

Home media 
The satellite rights of the film were acquired by Sun TV Network, while the digital rights were acquired jointly by Sun NXT and Netflix. The film was released on both platforms on 7 April 2022.

Reception

Box office 
The film entered the ₹100 crore club on its fifth day. The film reportedly entered the 200 crore club in 21 days. The film grossed around 179–200 crore and became one of the highest grossing Tamil films of the year.

Pre-sale records 

Critical response 
Etharkkum Thunindhavan received received mixed to positive reviews from critics.

M Suganth of The Times of India, after reviewing the film gave 3 out of 5 stars stating that "The film is also aware about the greyness of vigilantism and extra-judicial killings. It shows us Kannabiran using the judicial route to get justice and only when all doors are closed does he take up the law in his own hands. We even get a line with Kannabiran stating that he knows the value of a life." Ashameera Aiyappan of Firstpost after reviewing the film gave a rating of 3 out of 5 stating that "The film is also careful to not paint an idealistic, utopian dream. It acknowledges the deep personal trauma women face in such situations, the cruel judgements they are subjected to, and also how legal justice is almost inaccessible to most victims." Manoj Kumar R. of The Indian Express gave a rating of 2.5 out of 5 stars stating that "At best, Etharkkum Thunindhavan feels like a rush job that whittles down a terrible real-life crime to the lowest common denominator." Bhavana Sharma of Pinkvilla who gave a rating 2.5 out of 5 stars stated that "Surya’s acting, action scenes and mass elevations, D.Imman’s music are the assets of the film as a whole. So, only the audience who enjoys the peak with Surya fans & sentiments will like this movie. On the whole, for Surya Sivakumar , who always wins hearts, this film is worth a watch this weekend."

Ashwin Ram of Moviecrow gave 2.5 out of 5 stars stating that "Etharkkum Thuninthavan has its engaging moments, but there’s an equal amount of weak elements too. With a strong subject in hand, what could have been an enjoyable family entertainer with thrills is drained down to a mixed bag due to its mediocre packaging." Srinivasan Ramanujam of The Hindu after reviewing the film, stated that "The combination of Sathyaraj and Suriya, for the first time on the big screen, is charming no doubt, but there's little that comes out of those sequences. While Saranya breezes through the mother's role, Priyanka Mohan gets just one solid sequence. Vinay, who impressed in Sivakarthikeyan's Doctor, gets another similar role but doesn't have much to do beyond appearing on screen with villanous laughs. The final face-off has little sparkle. The comedy has little flavour. And the edit seems to have been done in a tearing hurry."

Mirchi9 who gave 2 out of 5 stars after reviewing the film stated that "Overall, ET has a below-par cringy first half and a decent second hour before losing again with a prolonged climax. At best, the message and the crime drama element make it a passable watch. Give it a try if you like Suriya and don’t mind the routineness." Behindwoods gave the film's rating 2.75 out of 5 stating that "Suriya's Etharkkum Thunindhavan voices an important issue in a commercial family drama template." Hindustan Times praised the film, saying that "Suriya holds the film together with a very strong performance. If Jai Bhim saw Suriya deliver a restrained performance, he goes all out to in Etharkkum Thunindhavan to pander to the masses."

Soumya Rajendran of The News Minute gave 2 out of 5 stars stating that "Etharkkum Thunindhavan means the daredevil who is ready for anything. Is Suriya ready to lend a ear to this criticism and perhaps change his approach to cinema? Less preaching, more craft? Less saving, more listening?"

Shubham Kulkarni of Koimoi gave the film’s rating 2.5 out of 5 and wrote that "People have a lot of expectations from Suriya who was almost in the race for the Oscars this year. But this is definitely not even close to the least expected things. Etharkkum Thunindhavan looks like a wannabe half baked movie that got lucky with the casting." Indiaglitz rated the film 3.5 out of 5 stating that "Go for this message driven heroic effort from Suriya and Pandiraj". Ranjani Krishnakumar of Film Companion stated that "It doesn’t help that Suriya feels miscast as Kannabiran. The speech, body language, mannerisms, and naughtiness feel more like Karthi’s zone. Suriya is too stiff to be goofy, too upright to be shady, too clear-headed to be vulnerable. He is at his best when he’s being the morally unambiguous vigilante, but can barely be convincing as the horny young man rushing to a song-and-dance show. This makes it appear like Suriya is walking in and out of character, making Etharkkum Thunindhavan an overall tough watch."

Lawsuit
A few functionaries of the Pattali Makkal Katchi (PMK) wrote to the cinema owners associations in some locations, including Cuddalore and Mayiladuthurai districts asking them not to screen the film. The dispute between the PMK and Suriya raged since the premiere of his film Jai Bhim, in which the PMK claimed the film insulted the Vanniyar caste. He also claimed that they will allow to screen the film only if Suriya publicly apologizes to the Vanniyar Caste.

Sequel
Owing to the film’s success, there were speculations about the possibility of a sequel. However, the makers have reportedly not made a decision about it.

Notes

References

External links 
 

2022 action thriller films
2022 films
Action films based on actual events
Films about harassment
Films about murder
Films about organised crime in India
Films about sexual abuse
Films about sexual harassment
Films directed by Pandiraj
Films scored by D. Imman
Films set in Chennai
Films shot in Chennai
Films shot in Goa
Films shot in Madurai
Indian action thriller films
Indian vigilante films
Thriller films based on actual events
Films postponed due to the COVID-19 pandemic
Film productions suspended due to the COVID-19 pandemic
Sun Pictures films